Epicadinus is a genus of crab spiders that was first described by Eugène Louis Simon in 1895.

Species
 it contains four species found from Mexico to Brazil:
Epicadinus biocellatus Mello-Leitão, 1929 – Brazil
Epicadinus spinipes (Blackwall, 1862) – Brazil
Epicadinus trispinosus (Taczanowski, 1872) (type) – Mexico, Panama, Ecuador, Peru, Bolivia, Trinidad and Tobago, French Guiana, Brazil
Epicadinus villosus Mello-Leitão, 1929 – Brazil, Paraguay, Uruguay, Argentina

Formerly included:
E. tuberculatus Petrunkevitch, 1910 (Transferred to Epicadus)

In synonymy:
E. albimaculatus Mello-Leitão, 1929 = Epicadinus spinipes (Blackwall, 1862)
E. cornutus (Taczanowski, 1872) = Epicadinus trispinosus (Taczanowski, 1872)
E. gavensis Soares, 1946 = Epicadinus spinipes (Blackwall, 1862)
E. helenae Piza, 1936 = Epicadinus villosus Mello-Leitão, 1929
E. marmoratus Mello-Leitão, 1947 = Epicadinus villosus Mello-Leitão, 1929
E. trifidus (O. Pickard-Cambridge, 1893) = Epicadinus trispinosus (Taczanowski, 1872)

See also
 List of Thomisidae species

References

Further reading

Araneomorphae genera
Spiders of Brazil
Spiders of Central America
Spiders of Mexico
Thomisidae